Patrick Cantillon (11 December 1874 – 25 March 1924) was an Irish hurler who played with club side Redmonds and at inter-county level with the Cork senior hurling team.

Playing career

Born in Ballinlough, Cork, Cantillon first played hurling as a member of the Redmonds club. He was a member of the club's senior team when they won back-to-back County Senior Championships in 1900 and 1901. These victories earned Cantillon a call-up to the Cork senior hurling team for the 1901 Munster Championship. He took over the captaincy of the team midway through the championship and won a Munster Championship medal after a win over Clare. Cantillon later captained Cork to a defeat by London in the 1901 All-Ireland final. He won a second successive Munster Championship medal in 1902, but was not included on the team for their subsequent success in the 1902 All-Ireland final.

Honours

Redmonds
Cork Senior Hurling Championship (2): 1900, 1901

Cork
Munster Senior Hurling Championship (2): 1901, 1902

References

1874 births
1924 deaths
Redmond's hurlers
Cork inter-county hurlers